Sheva Ausubel (1896–1957) was an American painter and textile artist.

Life
She studied at the National Academy of Design and with André Lhote.
She married artist Dane Chanase (1895–1975).
After a stint of about five years in Europe and Paris, the couple returned to the US on October 26, 1932, on board the ship "Europa".

Ausubel was a member of the Federal Art Project.

References

Ausubel, Nathan (c. 1960). The Art of Sheva Ausubel, edited and published by Dane Chanase.

External links
http://archive.jta.org/article/1934/01/25/2812581/sheva-ausubel-exhibit
http://www.arcade.nyarc.org/record=b930618~S7
http://www.worthpoint.com/worthopedia/sheva-ausubel-oil-painting-italy-1930-wpa

1896 births
1957 deaths
20th-century American painters
American textile artists
Federal Art Project artists